The Saturday Independent is a weekly newspaper founded by Beth and Chip Ramsey that formerly circulated throughout Coffee County, Tennessee, USA. The paper went out of business in 2013. 

Newspapers published in Tennessee